The 1962 Boston Red Sox season was the 62nd season in the franchise's Major League Baseball history. The Red Sox finished eighth in the American League (AL) with a record of 76 wins and 84 losses, 19 games behind the AL pennant winner and eventual World Series champion New York Yankees.

Offseason 
 October 20, 1961: Joe Ginsberg was released by the Red Sox.
 March 24, 1962: Tom Borland was traded by the Red Sox to the Houston Colt .45s for Dave Philley.

Regular season 
Bill Monbouquette and Earl Wilson each threw no-hitters for the Red Sox. Monbouquette threw his no-hitter against the Chicago White Sox, while Wilson no-hit the Los Angeles Angels.

On September 3, Don Gile hit a home run in the last at-bat of his career.

Season standings

Record vs. opponents

Opening Day lineup

Notable transactions 
 August 14, 1962: Dave Philley was released by the Red Sox.
 September 7, 1962: Galen Cisco was selected off waivers from the Red Sox by the New York Mets.

Roster

Player stats

Batting

Starters by position 
Note: Pos = Position; G = Games played; AB = At bats; H = Hits; Avg. = Batting average; HR = Home runs; RBI = Runs batted in

Other batters 
Note: G = Games played; AB = At bats; H = Hits; Avg. = Batting average; HR = Home runs; RBI = Runs batted in

Pitching

Starting pitchers 
Note: G = Games pitched; IP = Innings pitched; W = Wins; L = Losses; ERA = Earned run average; SO = Strikeouts

Other pitchers 
Note: G = Games pitched; IP = Innings pitched; W = Wins; L = Losses; ERA = Earned run average; SO = Strikeouts

Relief pitchers 
Note: G = Games pitched; W = Wins; L = Losses; SV = Saves; ERA = Earned run average; SO = Strikeouts

Farm system 

Source:

References

External links
1962 Boston Red Sox team page at Baseball Reference
1962 Boston Red Sox season at baseball-almanac.com

 

Boston Red Sox seasons
Boston Red Sox
Boston Red Sox
1960s in Boston